is a centaur and Uranus co-orbital discovered on February 27, 2015, by the Mount Lemmon Survey. It is the second known centaur on a horseshoe orbit with Uranus, and the third Uranus co-orbital discovered after  (a Trojan) and 83982 Crantor (a horseshoe librator). A second Uranian Trojan, was announced in 2017.

Description 

An early orbital calculation of the asteroid with an observation arc of 10 days suggested an extremely close MOID to Neptune, but further observations on March 27 refined the orbit to show that the asteroid passes no less than several astronomical units away from Neptune, and show the orbit instead being that of a typical centaur, with a perihelion near that of Saturn, and traveling near to Uranus and Neptune. Later, observations suggested a distant orbit traveling extremely distant from the Sun, but now this too has been shown to be incorrect with later observations. However, it does have a semimajor axis near that of Uranus, making it a Uranus co-orbital. However it is not a Trojan, as it stays near the opposite side of the Sun from Uranus.

A paper, submitted on July 27, 2015, analyzed 's orbital evolution, and suggested that it may be more stable than the other known Uranus co-orbitals due to its high inclination, and that many more undiscovered Uranus co-orbitals may exist.

Precovery images from 2003 were located soon after 's discovery, giving it an 11-year observation arc.

See also 
 
 83982 Crantor

Notes 
  Assuming an albedo from 0.05 (160 km) to 1 (40 km);  is definitely somewhere within this range, and cannot be any smaller than 40 kilometers, assuming the absolute magnitude is correct.

References

External links
 

Centaurs (small Solar System bodies)
Discoveries by MLS
Uranus co-orbital minor planets
20150227